The Northern Territory Softball Association is the smallest state body in the Australian Softball Federation with only two affiliated Associations.

In the Northern Territorys history they have never once won any of the ASF National Championships.

Yearly events 
The Northern Territory Softball Association holds an annual Softball Carnival as part of the Arafura Games, this usually comprises teams from the Australian Defence Force, USA, Singapore, and the Northern Territory.

The Association also sends teams to the South Australia Softball Association's yearly Labour Day Softball Carnival, entering teams in the Under 16 Girls and Under 19 Women categories.

State teams 
The Northern Territory periodically attends ASF National Championships
Under 16 Boys – Never Attended
Under 16 Girls – Last Attended in 2001 in Hobart
Under 19 Men – Never Attended
Under 19 Women – Last Attended in 2002 in Adelaide
Under 23 Men – Never Attended
Under 23 Women – Last Attended in 2005 in Melbourne
Open Men – Last Attended in 2003 in RedLands, Queensland
Open Women – Have not attended in the past 5 years

Associations 
The Northern Territory is made up of 3 Associations both holding their own weekend competitions;
Alice Springs Softball Association (Formed ????)
Northern Territory Softball Association (Formed ????)
And 1 Umpires Association;
Northern Territory Softball Umpires Association (Formed ????)

Clubs 
The Northern Territory Softball Association is made up of 4 Clubs;
Palmerston Pirates Softball Club
South Darwin Softball Club
Tracy Village Softball Club
Waratah Softball Club

See also 
Australian Softball Federation
ASF National Championships

External links 
Northern Territory Softball Association
Australian Softball Federation
International Softball Federation

Softball governing bodies in Australia
Sof